Babuza is a Formosan language of the Babuza and Taokas, indigenous peoples of Taiwan. It is related to or perhaps descended from Favorlang, attested from the 17th century.

Babuza was once spoken along much of the western coast of Taiwan. Its two rather divergent dialects, Poavosa and the extinct Taokas, were separated by Papora and Pazeh.

The first commercial publication to be written in Taokas is the picture book Osubalaki, Balalong Ramut, published in 2020.

See also
 Favorlang language

References

Resources

Dictionary

Formosan languages
Languages of Taiwan
Extinct languages of Asia